David Alexander may refer to:

Entertainers 
David Alexander (director) (1914–1983), American television director
Dave Alexander (blues musician) (1938–2012), American West Coast blues pianist & bassist
David M. Alexander (born 1945), American writer
Dave Alexander (musician) (1947–1975), American bassist for Iggy Pop & The Stooges
David Alexander (singer) (1929–1995), Welsh singer and entertainer

Politicians 
David W. Alexander (1812–1887), Los Angeles County Board of Supervisors
David Lindo Alexander (1842–1922), British lawyer and Jewish community leader
David Alexander (Tennessee politician) (born 1952), American state legislator in Tennessee
David Alexander (Scottish politician) (born 1958), Scottish leader of Falkirk local authority, Scotland
David J. Alexander, member of the Connecticut House of Representatives

Sportsmen 
David Alexander (footballer) (1869–1941), Scottish footballer
David Alexander (American football) (born 1964), American former NFL player
David Alexander (rugby league) (born 1968), Australian former NSWRL/ARL player

Others 
David Alexander (college president) (1932–2010), American academic, president of Pomona College and US National Secretary to the Rhodes Trust
David Alexander (Royal Marines officer) (1926–2017), British Royal Marines officer
David T. Alexander (born 1947), Canadian painter
David J. Alexander (1978-), Teacher/Secondary Leader

See also